Indian or Indians may refer to:

Peoples

South Asia 
 Indian people, people of Indian nationality, or people who have an Indian ancestor
 Non-resident Indian, a citizen of India who has temporarily emigrated to another country
 South Asian ethnic groups, referring to people of the Indian subcontinent, as well as the greater South Asia region  prior to the 1947 partition of India
 Anglo-Indians, people with mixed Indian and British ancestry, or people of British descent born or living in the Indian subcontinent
 East Indians, a Christian community in India

Europe 
 British Indians, British people of Indian origin

The Americas 
 Indo-Canadians, Canadian people of Indian origin
 Indian Americans, American people of Indian origin
 Indigenous peoples of the Americas, the pre-Columbian inhabitants of the Americas and their descendants
 Plains Indians, the common name for the Native Americans who lived on the Great Plains of North America
 Native Americans in the United States, the indigenous people in the United States
 Native American tribes, specific groups of Native Americans
 Indigenous peoples in Canada
 First Nations in Canada, the various Indigenous peoples in Canada who are neither Inuit nor Métis
 Indigenous peoples of South America, peoples living in South America in the pre-Columbian era and their descendants
 Native Mexicans, indigenous people of Mexico
 Indigenous peoples of Central America
 Indigenous peoples of the Caribbean
 West Indians, people from the Caribbean region and the Lucayan Archipelago
 Mardi Gras Indians, African-American Carnival revelers in New Orleans, Louisiana, whose suits are influenced by Native American ceremonial apparel

Australia 
 Aboriginal Australians, called "Indians" until the 19th century
 Indian Australians

Languages 
 Languages of India, including Indo-Aryan languages and Dravidian languages
 Indian English, a dialect of the English language used in India
 Indigenous languages of the Americas, spoken by indigenous peoples from Alaska and Greenland to the southern tip of South America

Places 
 Indian, West Virginia, a former unincorporated community in Kanawha County
 The Indians, an islet group in the British Virgin Islands
 Indian Creek (disambiguation)
 Indian Island (disambiguation)
 Indian River (disambiguation), several rivers and communities
 Indian Run (disambiguation), streams in the U.S. states of Pennsylvania and West Virginia
 Indian subcontinent
 Indian Ocean

Arts, entertainment, and media 
 Indian cinema

Films 
 Indian (1996 film), an Indian Tamil film starring Kamal Haasan
 Indian (2001 film), an Indian Hindi film

Music 
 Indians (musician), moniker of Danish singer Søren Løkke Juul accompanied by some musicians also collectively known as Indians
 "Indian" (song), by Sturm und Drang
 Indian (soundtrack), an album from the 1996 film
 "Indians" (song), by Anthrax
 Indians, a song by Gojira from their 2003 album The Link

Other arts, entertainment, and media 
 Indian (card game), a simple card game that involves strategy
 Indian soap opera, soap operas written, produced, and filmed in India
 Indians (play), a 1968 play by Arthur Kopit
 Indians (sculpture), a name for The Bowman and The Spearman, sculptures by Ivan Meštrović

Businesses 
 Indian (airline), a now-defunct state-owned airline of India, merged with Air India
 Indian Motocycle Manufacturing Company, an American company later called Indian Manufacturing Company, that produced the brand "Indian motorcycles" from 1901 to 1953

Sport 
 Calcutta Indians, pre independent football team of India that briefly played against international clubs and teams.
 Cleveland Indians, former name of the Cleveland Guardians, an American professional baseball team based in Cleveland, Ohio, US
 Frölunda HC or  Frölunda Indians, a Swedish professional ice hockey club based in Gothenburg, Sweden
 Hannover Indians, a German ice hockey club based in Hannover, Germany
 Indian Arrows, the developmental football team of All India Football Federation
 Indianapolis Indians, an American minor league baseball team based in Indianapolis, Indiana, US
 Indios de Mayagüez, a baseball team in the Puerto Rican Professional Baseball League
 Mumbai Indians, a franchise cricket team representing the city of Mumbai, India in the Indian Premier League
 Springfield Indians, an American minor professional ice hockey franchise, originally based in West Springfield, Massachusetts, US

Other uses 
 Indian cuisine, a wide variety of regional cuisines native to India
 Indian Head cent, a coin produced by the United States Mint from 1859 to 1909

See also 
 Hindustani (disambiguation)
 Indica (disambiguation)
 Indian Point (disambiguation)
 India (disambiguation)
 Indicum (disambiguation)
 Indicus (disambiguation)
 Indus (constellation), a constellation in the southern sky
 Native American name controversy, discussion about terminology to describe indigenous peoples of the Americas
 East Indies
 West Indies

Language and nationality disambiguation pages